Lee Jin-woo may refer to:

Lee Jin-woo (actor) (李珍雨, born 1969), South Korean actor
Lee Jin-woo (boccia) (born  1972), South Korean boccia player
Lee Jin-woo (footballer) (李鎭宇, born 1982), South Korean footballer
Lee Jin-woo (speed skater) (born 1986), South Korean speed skater